The 2003 Dwars door Vlaanderen was the 58th edition of the Dwars door Vlaanderen cycle race and was held on 26 March 2003. The race started in Kortrijk and finished in Waregem. The race was won by Robbie McEwen.

General classification

References

2003
2003 in road cycling
2003 in Belgian sport
March 2003 sports events in Europe